Mota is a genus of butterflies in the family Lycaenidae. The genus is monotypic containing the single Indomalayan species Mota massyla (Hewitson, 1869)    (Sikkim, Bhutan, Manipur, Sylhet, Cherrapunji, Assam, Burma, Thailand, Yunnan).

References

 
Arhopalini
Lycaenidae genera
Taxa named by Lionel de Nicéville